(IPA: , VOS Spelling: tjanting) is a pen-like tool used to apply liquid hot wax in the batik-making process in Indonesia, more precisely batik tulis (lit. "written batik"). Traditional Tjanting consists of copper wax-container with small pipe spout and bamboo handle. Traditional tjanting is made of copper, bronze, zinc or iron material, however modern version might use teflon.

Etymology

 is derived from Javanese word of canthing  which means the small scooping tool.

History 

Canting is originated in Java and invented by the Javanese, it is believed to be invented since  12th century.
G. P. Rouffaer reported that the gringsing batik pattern was already known by the 12th century in Kediri, East Java. He concluded that this delicate pattern could only be created by the canting, an etching tool that holds a small reservoir of hot wax.

Design 

A canting consists of:
 Nyamplung: a rounded liquid wax container, made from copper.
 Cucuk (IPA:): a small copper pipe or spout that connects to nyamplung container, it is where the liquid wax comes out to be applied to the cloth.
 Gagang: canting holder, usually made from bamboo or wood.

The size of canting may be varied according to the desired dot size or line thickness to be applied to the cloth. A batik craftsperson uses canting in a similar fashion as drawing using a pen.

Types 

There are three ways of classifying the types of canting:
 Based on its function:
 Canting Rengrengan: canting that is ideally used to make a batik pattern for the first time.
 Canting Isen: canting that is ideally used to fill a pattern that has been made beforehand.
 Based on the diameter of its cucuk:
 Small Canting: canting that has a small-sized cucuk with a diameter of less than 1 millimeter and is usually used as Canting Isen.
 Medium Canting: canting that has a medium-sized cucuk with a diameter of 1 – 2.5 millimeters and is usually used as Canting Rengrengan.
 Large Canting: canting with a large-sized cucuk with a diameter of more than 2.5 millimeters and is usually used to make a larger batik pattern or to fill a pattern that has been made beforehand with a block of wax.
 Based on the number of its cucuk:
 Canting Cecekan: canting with one cucuk.
 Canting Laron/Loron: canting with two cucuk.
 Canting Telon: canting with three cucuk that forms an equilateral triangle.
 Canting Prapatan: canting with four cucuk that forms a square.
 Canting Liman: canting with five cucuk that forms a square with a dot in the center of the square.
 Canting Byok: canting with an odd number of cucuk and is equal to or more than seven cucuk that forms a circle with a dot in the center of the circle.
 Canting Renteng/Galaran: canting with four or six cucuk that forms two parallel lines.

Technique

Firstly, the cloth must be washed, soaked and beaten with a large mallet. The hot and liquid wax is scooped from small wajan (wok) heated upon small stove. The batik craftsperson sometimes blow the spout tip of canting to allow the liquid wax to flow smoothly and to avoid clogging, then they draw the line or dot upon the cloth, applying the liquid wax, following the patterns and images that previously had been drawn using pencil. A pattern is then drawn with hot wax called malam using  canting. The wax functions as a dye-resist. After this, the cloth is dipped in a dye bath containing the first colour. After the cloth is dry, the wax is removed by scraping or boiling the cloth. This process is repeated as many times as the number of colours desired. For larger areas of cloth which need to be covered, the wax is applied using a tool called tonyok nemboki/mopoki.

See also 

 Batik
 Indonesian culture

References 

Batik
Indonesian culture